Nikolaos Georgiadis (born 23 March 1983) is a Greek professional footballer who plays as a right back.

Honours

Veria
Football League: Runner-up: 2011-12

PAS Giannina
Football League: Runner-up: 2008-09

References

External links
 
Myplayer.gr Profile
Profile at epae.org

1983 births
Living people
Greek footballers
Super League Greece players
Football League (Greece) players
PAS Giannina F.C. players
Veria F.C. players
Levadiakos F.C. players
Aris Thessaloniki F.C. players
Apollon Pontou FC players
Association football fullbacks